Hilary Crane (1933 – June 2009) was an English actress, best known for her role as Nora Jenkins, the mother of Peter 'Tucker' Jenkins in the BBC series Grange Hill and its sister show, Tucker's Luck.

Credits

Television

Film

References

External links
 

English television actresses
2009 deaths
Actresses from Liverpool
1933 births